Keown Station is a small community within Ross Township, Allegheny County, Pennsylvania, United States.  Keown Station is located near the corner of Babcock Boulevard and Three Degree Road. The area served as a stop along the Harmony Short Line Railroad, which previously ran from the City of Pittsburgh to points north.

Pittsburgh metropolitan area
Unincorporated communities in Allegheny County, Pennsylvania
Unincorporated communities in Pennsylvania